Alison Duke may refer to:
 Alison Duke (classicist)
 Alison Duke (filmmaker)